Ward 11 University—Rosedale is a municipal electoral division in Toronto, Ontario that has been represented in the Toronto City Council since the 2018 municipal election. It was last contested in 2022, with Dianne Saxe elected councillor for the 2022-2026 term.

History 
The ward was created in 2018 when the provincial government aligned Toronto's then-44 municipal wards with the 25 corresponding provincial and federal ridings. The current ward is made up of parts of the old Ward 19 Trinity—Spadina, Ward 20 Trinity—Spadina and Ward 27 Toronto Centre—Rosedale.

2018 municipal election 
Ward 11 University—Rosedale was first contested during the 2018 municipal election with seven candidates. Mike Layton was ultimately elected with 69.56 per cent of the vote.

Geography 
Ward 11 is part of the Toronto and East York community council.

University—Rosedale's west boundary is Ossington Avenue, and its east boundary is Bayview Avenue, the Don River, Rosedale Valley Road, Bloor Street, Charles Street, College Street and Yonge Street. The Canadian Pacific Railway tracks, Yonge Street, Mount Pleasant Cemetery and the Moore Park Ravine make up the north boundary, and Dundas Street makes up the south boundary.

Councillors

Election results

See also 

 Municipal elections in Canada
 Municipal government of Toronto
 List of Toronto municipal elections

References

External links 

 Councillor's webpage

Toronto city council wards
2018 establishments in Ontario